Mahatmyam or Mahatyam may refer to :

 Devi Mahatmyam is a Hindu text describing the Glory of the Goddess Durga.
 Makkal Mahatmyam is a 1992 Malayalam comedy film directed by Paulson.
 Panduranga Mahatyam (film) is a 1957 Telugu film directed by Kamalakara Kameswara Rao.
 Sri Kalahastiswara Mahatyam is a 1954 Telugu film.
 Sri Venkateswara Mahatyam is a 1960 Telugu musical film produced and directed by P. Pullaiah.